Andover Hills is a subdivision in southeastern Lexington, Kentucky, United States. Its boundaries are Todds Road to the east, Hays Boulevard to the south, Jacobson Park to the west, and Mapleleaf Park to the north. Schools in the district are Athens Chilesburg Elementary School, Edythe J. Hayes Middle School, and Henry Clay High School.

Description
Andover Hills consists of brick homes built in the 1970s through 2011, as well as townhomes that were built in the 1990s. The townhomes built in the 1990s feature brick. Most houses have basements and home sizes that range from 2,000 to 7,000 square feet. The units have garages and no basements that range from 1,100 to 2,000 square feet.

Neighborhood statistics

 Area: 
 Population: 1,143
 Population density: 2,436 people per square mile
 Median household income: $61,004

References

External links
 Andover Hill Neighborhood Association
 Andover Hills in Lexington, KY

Neighborhoods in Lexington, Kentucky